Theodore Poulakis (1622–1692) was a Greek Renaissance painter and teacher.  He is considered the father of the Heptanese School and one of the most prolific painters of Venetian Crete.  Poulakis was a member of the Cretan School, his contemporary was Emmanuel Tzanes.   Emmanuel Tzanes and Poulakis were active painters of the Cretan School until Candia, went to war with the Ottomans around 1649. Candia finally fell after twenty years of siege in 1669.  Poulakis settled on the island of Corfu.  Stephanos Tzangarolas was another famous painter in Corfu around the same period.  Poulakis's works are likened to Andreas Pavias and Georgios Klontzas.  Poulakis works exhibit qualities of the Venetian school.  Over 130 of his paintings have survived and can be found all over the world.

History
Poulakis was born in Chania Crete.  He was the son of Antonios.  He was married and had two children Vittirous and Eleni.  By the age of twenty-four, he was living in Venice.  He stayed there for thirteen years until 1657.  His son was baptized in Venice in 1646 and his daughter two years later.  He was a member of the Quaranta council.  Famous Greek painters Philotheos Skoufos, Emmanuel Tzanes, Konstantinos Tzanes, and Ioannis Moskos were all living in Venice around that time.  Poulakis was a member of the Greek Brotherhood of Venice in 1654.       

In 1657, Poulakis migrated to Corfu.  He signed a six-year contract to teach painting to Marinos Damistras son Tzorzi.  According to the contract, Tzorzi had to follow Poulakis anywhere he went including Venice.  Philotheos Skoufos was a witness for Poulakis in a legal matter around 1666.  Poulakis traveled to Cephalonia where he painted.  By 1671, he was back in Venice one year later he was voted a member of the Quaranta e Gionta.  In 1673, he took part in a baptism.  By 1675, he was back in Corfu where he lived out the remainder of his life.  He died on  November 16, 1692.

Painting style

Some of his paintings escaped the traditional maniera greca and exhibit fuller shapes and variations of color.  His work  Hymn to the Virgin followed the Greek tradition and is comparable to Andreas Pavias Crucifixion of Jesus.
Clearly, both artists try to fill the canvas with figures.  Both of the paintings follow the traditional Greek style. 
Another painting by Greek painter Georgios Klontzas, All Creation Rejoices in Thee closely resembles Hymn to the Virgin where the virgin is at the Center of the icon and countless figures occupy the iconic space.  Georgios Klontzas clearly inspired the work of Poulakis.

He is one the fathers of the Heptanese School due to his transition from painting styles.  He does not always observe the traditional lines and shapes of maniera greca.  His paintings Adam and Eve, Noah's Ark, and the Birth of Isaac are examples of the transitional period of the Cretan School to the more refined sophisticated art of the Heptanese School.  Clearly, Michael Damaskinos experimented with this transition in his The Last Supper, and The Wedding of Cana.   
  
Theodore Poulakis takes his viewers from the Cretan School to the Heptanese School but Michael Damaskinos began playing with the idea one hundred years before Poulakis.   El Greco never successfully converted the Cretan School to his stylistic transitions.  Poulakis continued painting until the time of his death.

Gallery

Cretan School

Heptanese School

Notable works
In Thee Rejoiceth (Poulakis)
Adoration of Joseph, Collection Sterbini Rome, Italy
The Four Knights of the Apocalypse Collection by S. Amberg Switzerland
Onuphrius Entrhoned Livorno, Italy
John the Baptist as Child Sotheby's London, United Kingdom
John the Theologian Lefkosia, Cyprus
Crucifixion, Collection of Abou-Adal Beirut, Lebanon
All Thee Rejoices Private Collection Spain
Noah's Ark (Poulakis)
The Archangel Michael (Poulakis)
The Fall of Man (Poulakis)
The Miracle of the Holy Belt

See also
Greek scholars in the Renaissance
Ioannis Apakas
Konstantinos Kontarinis
Ioannis Tzen

References

Bibliography

1622 births
1692 deaths
Cretan Renaissance painters
17th-century Greek people
People from Chania
17th-century Greek painters
Painters of the Heptanese School
Greek Baroque painters